Wendy Campbell-Purdie was a New Zealand woman who worked with a British timber firm in Corsica. She was born in c. 1925 in New Zealand and mostly brought up there. When travel became easier after the Second World War she set off on the young New Zealander's traditional grand tour. In Hampshire, England, she called upon Richard St. Barbe Baker, a tree expert, and learned about his idea that green wall agriculture could tame the desert.

Campbell-Purdie went to a desert in Tiznit, Morocco, in 1964 and created an oasis with 2,000 trees that she planted. After Algerian Independence in 1962, Campbell-Purdie travelled to Algeria, where she was given a 100 hectare plot which used to be a French military dump, which received much of the town's waste water. Campbell-Purdie successfully planted 1,000 seeds, and the Algerian government subsequently offered help. She ended up planting 130,000 trees in and around Bou Saada, under the aegis of the Algerian Red Crescent.

Campbell-Purdie formed the Bou Saada Trust to raise money for her war against the Sahara.  She left Algeria in 1970, when her health broke down. She appeared as herself on the television show "To Tell the Truth" in 1973.  She died in Athens on 20/1/1985, aged 59.

References

English scientists